Pleuronaia barnesiana is a species of bivalve in the family Unionidae, common name Tennessee Pigtoe. It is endemic to the United States.

References

Molluscs of the United States
barnesiana
Bivalves described in 1838